A fiancé is a man who is engaged.

Fiance or fiancee may also refer to:

Film and television 
 The Fiancee (film), a 1980 East German film
 Fiancee (TV series), a 2013 Chinese TV series
 The Fiances, a 1963 Italian film

Music 
 Fiancé (Ed Tullett album), 2016
 The Fiancée (album), a 2007 album from the Christian metalcore band The Chariot
 "Fiance", a song by Cat Power from her 1996 album Myra Lee

Literature 
 “Betrothed”, a short story by Anton Chekhov, called “The Fiancée” in some editions